Christopher Michael Holley (born November 23, 1971) is an American actor known for his role as Beanie in Smokin' Aces.

He was born in Minot, North Dakota and at one time attended Wheatland Union High School. His first acting role was an uncredited appearance in the 1995 film Black Panther. He has since appeared in a number of other films including Smokin' Aces, where he appeared as Beanie. He also appeared in the 2010 direct-to-video sequel, Smokin' Aces 2: Assassins' Ball. He has had a number of small roles in films like 21, Pride and Glory, and the VOD 2014 film Stretch. He has appeared on a number of television shows including Trauma and Those Who Kill. He will also appear in the upcoming NBC show State of Affairs.

Film and television roles

References

African-American male actors
American male film actors
American male television actors
Male actors from North Dakota
People from Minot, North Dakota
1971 births
Living people
21st-century African-American people
20th-century African-American people